Babulal may refer to:

Amerish Babulal Bera (born 1965), American physician and politician
Prabhudas Babulal Bhilawekar, member of the 13th Maharashtra Legislative Assembly
Babulal Chaudhary (born 1948), Indian Bharatiya Janata Party politician
Babulal Dahiya, farmer and poet
Babulal Gaur (1929–2019), Indian politician of the Bharatiya Janata Party (BJP)
Babulal Jain (1934–2021), Indian politician of the Bharatiya Janata Party
Babulal Marandi (born 1958), Indian politician of the Bharatiya Janata Party (BJP)
Babulal Nagar, Indian politician formerly with the Indian National Congress party
Babulal Patodi (1920–2012), Indian social worker and freedom activist
Babulal Sethia DL, British Consultant Cardiac Surgeon
Babulal Solanki, Indian politician
Babulal Tiwari, Indian politician

See also
Bengal Film Journalists' Association – Babulal Chowkhani Memorial Trophy for Best Original Story
Babu (disambiguation)
Babu Lall
Boublil (disambiguation)